Wigle Whiskey (pronounced "wiggle") is an artisan small batch whiskey distillery in the Strip District neighborhood of Pittsburgh. Wigle Whiskeys are the flagship products of the Pittsburgh Distilling Company, LLC, which is entirely family owned and operated.

History

Wigle began operations in 2011, and opened its doors to the public in March 2012. Wigle was the first distillery to open in Pittsburgh since Joseph S. Finch's distillery, located at South Second and McKean streets, closed in the 1920s.  At that time, only two other distilleries existed in the rest of Pennsylvania. The founders of Wigle Whiskey were instrumental to the passage of Pennsylvania House Bill 242 in December 2011, establishing a new distillery license allowing craft distilleries to sell their own products onsite, which led to the growth of craft distilleries in Pennsylvania. The bill allowed Wigle to sell spirits to customers. Wigle purchased the distillery building and a neighboring building in early 2019 to provide more room for tasting, tours, whiskey production, and community programs.

Wigle's founders, Mark Meyer, Mary Ellen Meyer, Meredith Meyer Grelli, Eric Meyer, Alexander Grelli, and Jeff Meyer, named the distillery after Philip Wigle, a man convicted of treason in 1794 and sentenced to hang for his actions in the Whiskey Rebellion, wherein Alexander Hamilton leveled the first excise tax-on whiskey. Wigle punched a tax collector, helping to incite four years of protests and riots that would come to be known as the Whiskey Rebellion. Wigle was later pardoned by George Washington. Washington feared hanging Wigle would stir a civil war in the young nation.

Wigle Whiskey was at the center of the "Pennsylvania Rye Revival" and the growth of Pittsburgh's whiskey heritage tourism. The distillery offers tours, which include a history of the Whiskey Rebellion. Owners Mark Meyer and Meredith Meyer Grelli are authors of The Whiskey Rebellion & the Rebirth of Rye (Belt, 2017), which describes rye's origins and the history of Pittsburgh, and provides a guide to making rye whiskey and recipes for cocktails.

In 2018, Wigle partnered with Pittsburgh's Heinz History Center on a Prohibition Rye whiskey to accompany the museum's "American Spirits: The Rise and Fall of Prohibition" exhibition. Wigle has also partnered with other museums, including the Mattress Factory and the Carnegie Science Center in Pittsburgh, the Allegheny Museum in Cumberland, Maryland, and the Smithsonian's National Museum of American History in Washington, D.C. Wigle is also involved in the development of a Whiskey Rebellion trail following the Great Allegheny Passage, a trail that extends from Pittsburgh, through Pennsylvania and Maryland to Mt. Vernon. Wigle partnered with the Omni Bedford Springs Hotel in Bedford, Pennsylvania, a town about 100 miles southeast of Pittsburgh where Washington led his troops during the Whiskey Rebellion. Wigle's annual event during the Whiskey Rebellion Heritage Festival raises money for nonprofits.

In 2013, the Meyer family opened a new facility in the Northside area of Pittsburgh, the Wigle Whiskey Barrelhouse and Garden. A former produce warehouse, the barrelhouse provided a place for tastings and tours. The family also purchased two vacant lots neighboring the barrelhouse for gardens for botanicals used in the spirits.

In April 2017, Wigle opened a cocktail bar and bottle shop, the Wigle Whiskey Tasting Room, at the Omni William Penn Hotel. In 2018, Wigle opened a Tasting Room and Bottle Shop in Ross Park Mall. During the holiday shopping season, Wigle also runs pop-up kiosks in Pittsburgh's South Hills Village Mall. Wigle holds weekly labeling parties every Tuesday, where guests label bottles in exchange for drinks.

Process

Wigle is an organic "grain-to-glass" distiller, which means that the distillery obtains ingredients from nearby farms in Washington County, Pennsylvania and eastern Ohio, mills grains on site, where they are distilled, and serves them at the distillery. The Meyer family worked with the Artisan Distilling Program at Michigan State University throughout the start up of the distillery. Wigle distills their whiskey from scratch.

Wigle led a two year study into regional terroir by producing batches of Rye Whiskey from rye grain sourced from farms in Saskatchewan, Minnesota and Pennsylvania. The distillery found differences in the tastes and compounds of the resulting whiskies that could be traced back to the regional grains used in the process.

Products

Wigle Whiskey produces Organic Straight Rye Whiskeys, Organic Straight Bourbons, Dutch Style Gins, Rum and Bitters. Wigle's Bourbon was the first bourbon produced in Pennsylvania in more than 40 years. In March, 2020, Wigle began manufacturing hand sanitizer for Pittsburgh's first responders to help ease coronavirus-induced shortages.

Awards
Two of Wigle's co-founders, Alex Grelli and Meredith Meyer Grelli, were named James Beard Award Semi-Finalists in 2018. In 2018, Wigle Whiskey's Organic Ginever was awarded Best in Class Gin by the American Craft Spirits Association. Its Bourbon won a gold medal and the Distillery was awarded an additional 16 medals across its portfolio, making it the most awarded craft distillery in the country by the American Craft Spirits Association for the second year running.

See also

Notes

References

Economy of Pittsburgh
Whiskies of the United States
Whiskey Rebellion
Distilleries in Pennsylvania
Microdistilleries